Shared reading is an instructional approach in which the teacher explicitly models the strategies and skills of proficient readers.

In the first chapter of the shared reading guide for classroom teachers Read It Again!'s Brenda Parks asks, "What is Shared Reading?" She then answers the question by writing, "Shared reading is a collaborative learning activity, based on research by Don Holdaway (1979), that emulates and builds from the child's experience with bedtime stories."

In early childhood classrooms, shared reading typically involves a teacher and a large group of children sitting closely together to read and reread carefully selected enlarged texts. Shared reading can also be done effectively with smaller groups.

With this instructional technique, students have an opportunity to gradually assume more responsibility for the reading as their skill level and confidence increase. Shared reading also provides a safe learning environment for students to practice the reading behaviours of proficient readers with the support of teacher and peers. Shared reading may focus on needs indicated in assessment data and required by grade level curriculum expectations. The text is always chosen by the teacher and must be visible to the students.

Description

Traditionally, shared reading has used paper-based materials.  However, recently a number of electronic resources have been developed.  One such resource is an online resource called Mimic Books.  This resource has been specifically designed to be used on interactive whiteboards for shared reading lessons. The benefits of this resource is that it replicates the look and appearance of a real big book but on the interactive whiteboard making it clearly visible to children. By increasing the amount of shared-reading in the home, parents are able to help children with their development of a larger knowledge base for understanding the world.

Purpose
The main purpose of shared reading is to provide children with an enjoyable experience, introduce them to a variety of authors, illustrators and types of texts to entice them to become a reader. The second and equally as important purpose is to teach children the reading process and teach systematically and explicitly how to be readers and writers themselves. (Parkes, 2000).  Through shared reading, children learn to track print and connect print to speech (Clay, 2000). By increasing the amount of shared-reading in the home, parents are able to help children with their development of a larger knowledge base for understanding the world.

Specification for texts
When selecting texts for reading, teachers typically look for text that is appropriate for the reading level of the students, that is also cross-curricular and relevant in its nature.  The text should be of an appropriate length for study and be adequately complex.  The text should also have an impact.

Method
In primary grades, the teacher reads while the children are encouraged to read along. The more familiar the text, the more the teachers asks of the students in terms of reading, talking and answering questions about the reading. In upper grades, the teacher reads the text aloud after stating a focus, and then re-reads the text, asking questions specific to the focus of choice (and may ask students to join). The focus may include things like: analysis, predictions, drawing inferences, grammar and punctuation, vocabulary development, questioning, literacy elements, critical thinking, phrasing, fluency, intonation, character and plot development.

According to Morrow (2009), shared reading usually begins with a teacher reading from a Big Book so that everyone can see the text. Stories that have predictable plots are best because students can participate early on in the shared reading experience.  During the first reading, students should simply listen to the story. The teacher might use a pointer to demonstrate directionality in text and one-to-one correspondence. As the text is read multiple times, students should begin to participate by chanting, making predictions, providing key words that are important in the story or participating in echo reading. Morrow (2009) also suggests to tape-record shared book readings and make it available for students to listen to at another time. "This activity provides a familiar and fluent model for reading with good phrasing and intonation for children to emulate" (Morrow, 2009, p. 199).

Resources 

 Fountas and Pinnell - Shared Reading Collection
 Learning at the Primary Pond - Shared Reading Bundles K-2

 Reading A-Z - Shared Reading Books
 Reading Rockets - Shared Reading Classroom Strategies

See also
 Guided reading
 Independent reading
 Learning to read

References

 Allan, Janet. Yellow brick roads: shared and guided paths to independent reading. Portland, ME: Stenhouse Publishers, 2000
 Booth, David. Guided reading process: techniques and strategies for successful instruction in K-8 classroom. Markham, ON: Pembroke Publishers, 1999.
 Booth, David. Literacy techniques for building successful readers and writers. Markham, ON: Pembroke Publishers, 2004.
 Brown, Susan. Shared Reading for grades 3 and beyond: Working it out together. Wellington, NZ: Learning Media Limited, 2004.
 Cunningham, Patricia M. Classrooms that work: they call read and write. Boston, MA: Allyn and Bacon, 2003.
 Fountas, Irene C. Guided Reading: good first teaching for all children. Portsmouth, NH: Heinemann, 1996.
 Holley, Cynthia. Warming up to big books. Bothwell, WA: The Wright Group, 1995.
 Kaner, Etta. The class that reads: best practices for teaching primary reading. Toronto, ON: Elementary Teachers’ Federation of Ontario, 2001
 McTeague, Frank. Shared Reading in the middle and high school year. Markham, ON: Pembroke Publishers, 1992.
 Morrow, L. (2009). Literacy development in the early years (6th ed.). New York, NY: Pearson.
 Ontario. A guide to effective literacy instruction. Grades 4 to 6  Ministry of Education, 2006.
 Parkes, Brenda. Read it again! Revisiting shared reading.Portland, ME: Stenhouse, 2000.
 Peetoom, Adrian. Shared Reading: risks with whole books. Richmond Hill, ON: Scholastic-TAB, 1986.
 Powell, Richard. Come back, bouncer!  Toronto: W.H. Smith, 1990.
 Slaughter, Judith Pollard. Beyond storybooks: young children and the shared book experience. Newark, DE: International Reading Association, 1992.
 Swartz, Stanley L.  Shared Reading: Reading with children.  Parsipanny, NJ: Dominie Press/Pearson Learning Group, 2002.

Notes

Learning to read